Lungga Point is a suburb of Honiara, Solomon Islands and is located East of the main center and North-West of Honiara International Airport .

References

Populated places in Guadalcanal Province
Suburbs of Honiara